Satapliasauropus is an ichnogenus of dinosaur footprint, found at Sataplia, mountain 6 km north-west of the city of Kutaisi, Georgia.

See also

 List of dinosaur ichnogenera

References

Dinosaur trace fossils
Theropods